The Dallas Impact are a team in the American Basketball Association which began play in the 2010-2011 season. The Impact is based in Dallas, Texas. This team replaces the failed Dallas Generals franchise which competed briefly in the 2009-2010 season.  Despite replacing the Dallas Generals, the Impact are also a team that has folded in the ABA.

History

2010
With their second win on December 1 to improve to 2-4, they defeated the North Texas Fresh 140-119, using a 48-point third quarter to pull away and forced 29 turnovers.

References

External links
Dallas Impact official website

American Basketball Association (2000–present) teams
Basketball teams in Dallas
Basketball teams established in 2010